Halliru Dauda Jika was born in 1976 in Bauchi State, Nigeria. He is a businessman and a politician. He was once a member and shortly the speaker of Bauchi state house of assembly, member house of representatives  and currently a senate member representing Bauchi Central. He is also known as Dokaji.

Education 
Jika went to Sardauna Memorial College in Kaduna, Kaduna State and graduated in 1999. He then moved to Kaduna Polytechnic to study Civil Engineering and graduate in 2003.

Political career 
Jika was elected as a representative of Darazo and Ganjuwa Constituency in the Federal House of Representatives and served two term as a representative, first term between 2007 and 2011 and second term between 2011 and 2015. In the 2019 general election, he was elected senator for Bauchi Central under the flag of the APC.

Personal life 
Jika is a Muslim. He is married  with children.

References 

All Progressives Congress politicians
21st-century Nigerian politicians
People from Bauchi State
Kaduna Polytechnic alumni
1976 births
Living people